Paulo Sérgio Gralak (born 18 September 1969), known as just Gralak, is a Brazilian former professional football defender.

External links
 
 
 

1969 births
Living people
Brazilian footballers
Association football defenders
Paraná Clube players
Sport Club Corinthians Paulista players
Coritiba Foot Ball Club players
FC Girondins de Bordeaux players
Ligue 1 players
İstanbulspor footballers
Süper Lig players
Brazilian expatriate footballers
Brazilian expatriate sportspeople in Turkey
Brazilian expatriate sportspeople in France
Expatriate footballers in Turkey
Expatriate footballers in France
Brazilian people of Polish descent